Wimar Witoelar (14 July 1945 – 19 May 2021) was an Indonesian journalist and talk show host. He was presidential press secretary to Indonesia's fourth president, Abdurrahman Wahid, from 1999 to 2001. He died in Pondok Indah Hospital in Jakarta of complications from sepsis.

Publications

Wimar Witoelar. 2002. No Regrets: Reflections of a Presidential Spokesman, Jakarta: Equinox Publishing, .

References

1945 births
2021 deaths
Indonesian journalists
Bandung Institute of Technology alumni
George Washington University alumni
People from West Bandung Regency
Deaths from sepsis